Reciprocal inhibition describes the relaxation of muscles on one side of a joint to accommodate contraction on the other side. In some allied health disciplines, this is known as reflexive antagonism. The central nervous system sends a message to the agonist muscle to contract. The tension in the antagonist muscle is activated by impulses from motor neurons, causing it to relax.

Mechanics 

Joints are controlled by two opposing sets of muscles called extensors and flexors, that work in synchrony for smooth movement. When a muscle spindle is stretched, the stretch reflex is activated, and the opposing muscle group must be inhibited to prevent it from working against the contraction of the homonymous muscle. This inhibition is accomplished by the actions of an inhibitor interneuron in the spinal cord.

The afferent of the muscle spindle bifurcates in the spinal cord. One branch innervates the alpha motor neuron that causes the homonymous muscle to contract, producing the reflex. The other branch innervates the inhibitory interneuron, which then innervates the alpha motor neuron that synapses onto the opposing muscle. Because the interneuron is inhibitory, it prevents the opposing alpha motor neuron from firing, thereby reducing the contraction of the opposing muscle. Without this reciprocal inhibition, both groups of muscles might contract simultaneously and work against each other.

If opposing muscles were to contract at the same time, a muscle tear can occur. This may occur during physical activities such as running, during which opposing muscles engage and disengage sequentially to produce coordinated movement. Reciprocal inhibition facilitates ease of movement and is a safeguard against injury. However, if a "misfiring" of motor neurons occurs, causing simultaneous contraction of opposing muscles, a tear can occur. For example, if the quadriceps femoris and hamstring contract simultaneously at a high intensity, the stronger muscle (traditionally the quadriceps) overpowers the weaker muscle group (hamstrings). This can result in a common muscular injury known as a pulled hamstring, more accurately called a muscle strain.

Duration

The phenomenon is fleeting, incomplete, and weak. For example, when the triceps brachii is stimulated, the biceps is reflexively inhibited. The incompleteness of the effect is related to postural and functional tone. Also, some reflexes in vivo are polysynaptic, with entire muscle groups responding to noxious stimuli.

Application in physical therapy

Reciprocal inhibition is the basic original notion behind indirect muscle energy techniques. While this notion is now understood to be incomplete, the clinical mechanism of reflexive antagonism continues to be useful in physical therapy.

Muscle energy techniques that use reflexive antagonism, such as rapid deafferentation techniques, are medical guideline techniques and protocols that make use of reflexive pathways and reciprocal inhibition as a means of switching off inflammation, pain, and protective spasm for entire synergistic muscle groups or singular muscles and soft tissue structures.

References

Further reading
1. Fryer G 2000 Muscle Energy Concepts –A Need for a Change. Journal of Osteopathic Medicine. 3(2): 54 – 59
Fryer G 2006 MET: Efficacy & Research IN: Chaitow L (Ed) Muscle Energy Techniques (3rd edition) Elsevier, Edinburgh
Ruddy T 1961 Osteopathic rhythmic resistive duction therapy. Yearbook of Academy of Applied Osteopathy 1961, Indianapolis, p 58
Solomonow M 2009 Ligaments: A source of musculoskeletal disorders. J Bodywork & Movement Therapies 13(2): IN PRESS
Smith, M., Fryer, G. 2008 A comparison of two muscle energy techniques for increasing flexibility of the hamstring muscle group Journal of Bodywork and Movement Therapies 12 (4), pp. 312–317
McPartland, J.M. 2004 Travel trigger points - Molecular and osteopathic perspectives Journal of the American Osteopathic Association 104 (6), pp. 244–249
Hamilton, L., Boswell, C., Fryer, G. 2007 The effects of high-velocity, low-amplitude manipulation and muscle energy technique on suboccipital tenderness International Journal of Osteopathic Medicine 10 (2-3), pp. 42–49
McFarland, J.M. 2008 The endocannabinoid system: An osteopathic perspective Journal of the American Osteopathic Association 108 (10), pp. 586–600
Magnusson M Simonsen E Aagaard P et al. 1996a Mechanical and physiological responses to lengthening with and without pre-isometric contraction in human skeletal muscle Archives of Physical Medicine & Rehabilitation 77:373-377
Magnusson M Simonsen E Aagaard P et al. 1996b A mechanism for altered flexibility in human skeletal muscle. Journal of Physiology 497(Part 1):293-298
Anatomical terms of muscle

Bibliography
 
 Neuroscience Online, Chapter 2: Spinal Reflexes and Descending Motor Pathways. James Knierim, Ph.D., Department of Neuroscience, The Johns Hopkins University http://nba.uth.tmc.edu/neuroscience/s3/chapter02.html

Muscular system
Motor control